John Whalley may refer to:

 John Whalley (MP) (1633–?), 17th-century English politician
 John Whalley (theologian) (1699–1748), English clergyman and academic
 John Whalley (cricketer) (1872–1925), Australian cricketer
 J. Irving Whalley (1902–1980), American politician
 John Whalley (economist) (born 1947), Canadian economist

See also
 John Walley (died 1615), English politician
 John Whaley (disambiguation)